Joyfield Township is a civil township of Benzie County in the U.S. state of Michigan. The population was 763 at the 2020 census. The township is located in the south central portion of the county. US 31 and M-115 converge at the northern edge of the township.

Geography

Demographics
As of the census of 2000, there were 777 people, 286 households, and 217 families residing in the township. There were 338 housing units at an average density of 16.9 per square mile (6.5/km2). The racial makeup of the township was 94.08% White, 1.67% African American, 1.54% Native American, 0.13% Asian, 0.64% from other races, and 1.93% from two or more races. Hispanic or Latino of any race were 3.35% of the population.

There were 286 households, out of which 32.9% had children under the age of 18 living with them, 64.3% were married couples living together, 5.6% had a female householder with no husband present, and 23.8% were non-families. 19.2% of all households were made up of individuals, and 7.3% had someone living alone who was 65 years of age or older.  The average household size was 2.64 and the average family size was 2.96.

In the township the population was spread out, with 27.8% under the age of 18, 6.8% from 18 to 24, 27.5% from 25 to 44, 24.1% from 45 to 64, and 13.8% who were 65 years of age or older.  The median age was 39 years. For every 100 females, there were 101.3 males.  For every 100 females age 18 and over, there were 102.5 males.

The median income for a household in the township was $36,029, and the median income for a family was $38,472. Males had a median income of $26,477 versus $21,250 for females. The per capita income for the township was $14,692.  About 5.8% of families and 9.5% of the population were below the poverty line, including 11.7% of those under age 18 and 5.2% of those age 65 or over.

References

External links
Map of Joyfield Township

Townships in Benzie County, Michigan
Traverse City micropolitan area
Townships in Michigan